"Nuit 17 à 52" is a song by Christine and the Queens. It was released as a digital download on 3 June 2013 through Because Music as the lead single from his debut studio album Chaleur humaine (2014). On the US and UK editions of the album, it was replaced by an English version entitled "Night 52". The song was written by Héloïse Letissier, i.e. Christine and the Queens himself.

The song was also released alongside an extended play of the same name, which charted at number 130 on the French Albums chart.

Music video
A music video to accompany the release of "Nuit 17 à 52" was first released onto YouTube on 12 June 2013 at a total length of three minutes and fifty-five seconds. In this black-and-white video, Christine and the Queens plays several characters.

Track listing

Single

Extended plays

Chart performance

Single

EP

Release history

References

Songs about nights
2013 singles
2013 songs
Christine and the Queens songs
Because Music singles
Songs written by Héloïse Letissier
Christine and the Queens albums
2013 EPs
Because Music albums